The Shadow of Empress Wu, also known as Riyue Lingkong, is a Chinese television series about the relationship between Wu Zetian, the only female emperor in Chinese history, and Xie Yaohuan, a fictional female official serving in Wu's court. The series was directed by Lu Qi and starred Liu Xiaoqing, Eva Huang, Vincent Jiao, Ma Xiaowei and Yang Zi in the leading roles. It was first broadcast on CCTV from August 2007 to January 2008 in mainland China, and in November 2008 on HD Jade in Hong Kong.

Cast
 Liu Xiaoqing as Wu Zetian
 Eva Huang as Xie Yaohuan
 Vincent Chiao as Helan Minzhi
 Ma Xiaowei as Emperor Gaozong of Tang
 Yang Zi as Luo Binwang
 Li Zonghan as Qiao Zhizhi
 Zou Yuanlong as Li Hong
 Xu Shengnan as Li Xian
 Xu Baihui as Yang Meiyun
 Wen Qing as Xie Yaowei
 Li Xinyi as Shangguan Zhengshu
 Shi Daimei as Sai Hong Fu
 Ma Si'er as Yang Fa
 Zhang Shuyu as Helan Minyue
 Long Yiyi as Wu Tuan'er
 Li Daojun as Xie Ao
 Liu Weiming as Wu Sansi
 Yu Le as Wu Yizong
 Liu Wenzhi as Shangguan Yi
 Yuan Man as Shangguan Tingzhi
 Luo Weilun as Ming Chongyan
 Cheng Lisha as Lady Wei
 Yan Feng as Zheng Yang
 Li Tong as Zheng Shu
 Fuyu Xingzi as Zheng Lan
 Hou Yongsheng as Li Ji
 Shen Lei as Li Jingye
 Xie Li as Xian Kelai
 Rao Jiexiang as Jingwei
 Jiang Feng as Chen Zi'ang
 Shun Haibin as Xue Huaiyi
 Guo Jinghua as Xu Jingzong
 Liu Xiangjing as Di Renjie
 Zhao Shoukai as Pei Yan
 Zhong Chao as Zhou Xing
 Zhang Xin as Lai Junchen
 Li Hanjun as Li Zhuan
 Guo Hongbo as Li Cheng
 Chen Chen as Wang Fuling
 Ma Yun as Wang Fusheng
Guan Xiaotong as Huajie Nana

See also
 Da Tang Nü Xun An

External links
  The Shadow of Empress Wu on Sina.com

2007 Chinese television series debuts
2008 Chinese television series endings
Television series set in the Tang dynasty
TVB dramas
Television series set in the Zhou dynasty (690–705)
Works about Wu Zetian
Mandarin-language television shows
China Central Television original programming
Chinese historical television series
Television series set in the 7th century
Cultural depictions of Wu Zetian
Cultural depictions of Di Renjie